Kinugawa may refer to one of the following.

 Kinugawa River, a river in Tochigi Prefecture, Japan
 Kinugawa (train), a train service in Japan
 Kinugawa Onsen, a hot spring area in Tochigi Prefecture, Japan
 Kinugawa-Onsen Station, a railway station in Tochigi Prefecture, Japan
 Kinugawa-Kōen Station, a railway station in Tochigi Prefecture, Japan
 Tōbu Kinugawa Line, a railway line in Japan
 Yagan Railway Aizu Kinugawa Line, a railway line in Japan